Itzel Sarahí Ríos de la Mora (born 31 August 1978) is a Mexican politician affiliated with the PRI. She served as Senator of the LXII Legislature of the Mexican Congress representing Colima, and previously served in the LVI Legislature of the Congress of Colima.

References

1978 births
Living people
Politicians from Tecomán, Colima
Women members of the Senate of the Republic (Mexico)
Members of the Senate of the Republic (Mexico)
Institutional Revolutionary Party politicians
21st-century Mexican politicians
21st-century Mexican women politicians
University of Colima alumni
Members of the Congress of Colima
Senators of the LXII and LXIII Legislatures of Mexico